Fernando Figueredo was the first Cuban-American to serve in the Florida State Legislature. He represented Monroe County in 1885. He also had many other accomplishments under his name.

References

Members of the Florida House of Representatives
Year of birth missing
Year of death missing